Alexander Plank  (born June 27, 1986) is an American autism advocate, filmmaker, actor, and the creator of Wrong Planet. He is known for founding the online community Wrong Planet, working on FX's television series The Bridge, and acting on The Good Doctor. At the age of 9, Plank was diagnosed with Asperger syndrome. Plank started Wrong Planet at the age of 17 in order to find others like him on the Internet. After the popularity of Wrong Planet grew, Plank began to be frequently mentioned in the mainstream media in articles relating to autism, Asperger's, and autism rights.

Early life and founding of Wrong Planet
As a child, Plank was bullied, excluded, and ridiculed by his peers, according to the book NeuroTribes. He only found out about his diagnosis of Asperger's after looking through papers in his parents' drawers. During his teen years, he searched the internet to find others like him but was frustrated by the lack of sites for individuals with autism. He was a Linux developer while still in high school and was familiar with the tools needed to create an online community.  After meeting Dan Grover, he created Wrong Planet at the age of 17.

Plank was a contributor to the online encyclopedia Wikipedia during its early years. He contributed to over 10,000 articles.

Alex Plank's story regarding the founding of Wrong Planet is covered in the special education curriculum of many universities in the United States. A page is dedicated to Alex Plank and his story in a textbook used by various universities such as the University of Virginia and George Mason University for introduction to special education courses.

Entertainment career

The Bridge
Alex Plank served as a consultant for the 2013 TV series The Bridge and worked with Diane Kruger on developing her character. He made his on-screen acting debut in the finale of season one, playing the role of the intern at the El Paso Times. Diane Kruger stated that Plank was on set every day, would go to the writers room, and was "instrumental" to both her performance and to the writers, as he would also work with the writers in the writers room. Kruger also stated that, while working on the show, she spent more time with Plank than with her partner and friends. Plank introduced a variety of autistic tendencies into Kruger's character of Sonya Cross, including stimming, awkwardness around eye contact, and a flat affect.

The way in which Plank got hired to work The Bridge was somewhat unconventional. He was reportedly called out of the blue by an executive at FX who had heard of Plank. The executive proceeded to ask him questions about his experiences and his knowledge of autism. After this, Plank was contacted by the showrunner, Elwood Reid, who invited him to the writers room to talk with the team of writers. It wasn't until after he met with Diane Kruger that Plank was offered a full-time position on the show.

The Good Doctor
In 2019, Plank guest starred in season 2 of The Good Doctor as Javier Maldonado, the roommate of Lana Moore, a patient who needs to undergo brain surgery. While Javi initially denies being Lana's boyfriend, it is later revealed that they have a sexual relationship that is more than platonic.

Plank's character's help is needed in the operating room to save Lana but Javi is sensitive to light (Plank wears progressively tinted glasses due to Javi's sensory processing disorder, a common condition comorbid to autism) and he refuses to help with the surgery. While Dr. Shaun Murphy, the show's autistic surgeon, tries to get Javi to overcome his fear by appealing to Javi's affinity for his ritual of playing insect trivia with Lana, Dr. Morgan Reznick appeals to Javi's emotions, insisting that Javi does indeed love Lana. But Javi replies that he does not love her. However, he later unexpectedly shows up during the surgery and saves Lana by overcoming his fear and going into the brightly lit operating room. After surgery, he confesses his love for her.

Filmography

Other autism advocacy

Plank gave the keynote speech at the Autism Society of America's national conference in 2010. He also gave the keynote at the ASCEND conference in San Francisco. According to People Magazine, Plank spoke at a conference in San Diego during which he was also involved in the first "all-autism" wedding where he served as DJ and best man.

In 2010, Plank started an Internet television program called Autism Talk TV. The venture is sponsored by Autism Speaks.  Rosie O'Donnell and John Elder Robison talked about the show on Rosie Radio. A front-page article from The New York Times, entitled "Navigating Love and Autism", written by Amy Harmon, was published in December 2011 about the romantic relationship between his two autistic co-hosts Jack Robison and Kirsten Lindsmith. Alex Plank, Wrong Planet, and Autism Talk TV were discussed.

Plank traveled to France in February 2012 to direct a documentary exposé, entitled Shameful, concerning the way in which autism is viewed and treated in France. When the film was in post-production it was covered by publications in both France and the United States, including L'Express and Vivre FM, a radio station in Paris; a trailer was released in July 2012.

Along with French activist David Heurtevent, Plank founded Autism Rights Watch, an NGO for which he serves as president.

Controversies
In 2006, Plank was sued by the victims of a 19-year-old member of the site, William Freund, who shot two people and himself in Aliso Viejo, California. Plank appeared on Good Morning America and Fox News discussing the incident.

References

External links
 

1986 births
American health activists
Autism activists
Male actors from Virginia
American disability rights activists
George Mason University alumni
Living people
People from Charlottesville, Virginia
People with Asperger syndrome
American male television actors
21st-century American male actors
Actors with disabilities